Depalpur Assembly constituency is one of the 230 Vidhan Sabha (Legislative Assembly) constituencies of Madhya Pradesh state in central India.

Overview 

Depalpur Assembly constituency is one of the 8 Vidhan Sabha constituencies located in Indore district which comes under Indore (Lok Sabha constituency).

Members of Legislative Assembly

See also

 Depalpur
 Indore
 Indore (Lok Sabha constituency)

References

Politics of Indore
Indore district
Assembly constituencies of Madhya Pradesh